The fifth season of the American teen drama television series Gossip Girl premiered on The CW on September 26, 2011, and concluded on May 14, 2012, consisting of 24 episodes. Based on the novel series of the same name by Cecily von Ziegesar, the series was developed for television by Josh Schwartz and Stephanie Savage. The CW officially renewed the series for a fifth season on April 26, 2011.

It was later announced that Taylor Momsen, who played Jenny Humphrey since the pilot, and Jessica Szohr, who joined the series as Vanessa Abrams in season one, would not be returning for the fifth season as regulars. Kaylee DeFer was upgraded to a series regular status in her roles as Serena's cousin, Charlie Rhodes, and aspiring actress/con artist Ivy Dickens. Hugo Becker also reprises his role as Blair's love interest, Prince Louis Grimaldi of Monaco.

With the confirmation of the 2011–12 schedule, The CW announced that Gossip Girl would be returning to Mondays at 8:00pm as a lead-in to Hart of Dixie.

Synopsis
Nate begins an affair with Diana Payne, an older woman who has many secrets, and begins working at The New York Spectator. Still posing as Charlie, Ivy also works there. Dan's first book, Inside, is published. Blair receives life-changing news and is still stuck in the love triangle between Chuck and Louis, and begins seeking comfort from the unlikeliest of people. Serena's family have multiple bombshells uncovered after one of their own dies. Serena and Nate make it their mission to uncover who is behind Gossip Girl once and for all.

Cast and characters

Main cast
 Blake Lively as Serena van der Woodsen
 Leighton Meester as Blair Waldorf
 Penn Badgley as Dan Humphrey
 Chace Crawford as Nate Archibald
 Ed Westwick as Chuck Bass
 Kaylee DeFer as Ivy Dickens
 Kelly Rutherford as Lily Humphrey
 Matthew Settle as Rufus Humphrey
 Kristen Bell as Gossip Girl (uncredited)

Recurring cast
 Hugo Becker as Prince Louis Grimaldi
 Margaret Colin as Eleanor Waldorf
 Elizabeth Hurley as Diana Payne
 Michael Michele as Jane Bettinger
 Brian J. Smith as Max Harding
 Zuzanna Szadkowski as Dorota Kishlovsky
 Joanne Whalley as Princess Sophie Grimaldi
 Roxane Mesquida as Princess Beatrice Grimaldi
 Sheila Kelley as Carol Rhodes
 Marina Squerciati as Alessandra Steele
 Wallace Shawn as Cyrus Rose
 Alice Callahan as Jessica Leitenberg
 Amanda Setton as Penelope Shafai
 Nan Zhang as Kati Farkas
 James Naughton as William van der Bilt
 Caroline Lagerfelt as CeCe Rhodes
 Aaron Tveit as Tripp van der Bilt III
 Ella Rae Peck as Lola Rhodes
 Michelle Trachtenberg as Georgina Sparks
 William Baldwin as William van der Woodsen
 Aaron Schwartz as Vanya
 Desmond Harrington as Jack Bass
 Robert John Burke as Bart Bass

Guest cast
 Zoë Bell as Ally
 David Patrick Kelly as Noah Shapiro
 John Shea as Harold Waldorf
 St. Vincent as herself

Episodes

Production
The CW officially renewed the series for a fifth season on April 26, 2011.

On May 19, 2011, with the reveal of The CW's 2011–12 television schedule, Gossip Girl stayed on Monday night and moved to the 8:00 pm Eastern/7:00 pm Central timeslot as a lead-in to Hart of Dixie, which is produced by Gossip Girl'''s executive producers Josh Schwartz and Stephanie Savage. The fifth season premiered on Monday, September 26, 2011.

Filming for the season began on July 7, 2011. On August 3, 2011, The CW ordered two additional episodes for the fifth season, which will now total at 24. Executive producer Joshua Safran announced that he would be "pulling out all the stops" to make the 100th episode of the show special, which is expected to air in January. On the date of the season premiere, the show used footage of the New York cityscape that showed the World Trade Center before the September 11 attacks. Footage containing the World Trade Center have been omitted by films and TV shows such as Sex and the City and The Sopranos to honor individuals who died in the attacks. The network has not responded to criticism regarding the usage of the footage.

Despite dwindling ratings, series executives were confident the show will be renewed for a sixth season. Head of Warner Bros. Television, Peter Roth was also confident that the show will return, stating, "I can't really say at this point, but I would hope and expect that there would be at least another year—if not years—to come." Later on, executive producer Stephanie Savage hinted that a sixth and final season was likely. "We're not writing a series finale this year," said Savage. She added "I checked in with the bosses to make sure we're not shooting ourselves in the foot" and said the cast contracts run out at the end of the next season so "that feels like probably an organic ending point".

St. Vincent performed "Cruel" and "Cheerleader" from her Strange Mercy album during the Valentine's Day episode.

Cast

Blake Lively, Leighton Meester, Penn Badgley, Chace Crawford, and Ed Westwick all returned as series regulars. Kaylee DeFer was upgraded to series regular status, while Taylor Momsen and Jessica Szohr exited the show, though they were both invited back as guest stars. Kelly Rutherford and Matthew Settle also returned as regulars.

On April 6, 2011, 10 Things I Hate About You star Ethan Peck landed a guest-starring role on the show. Peck made his debut in the fourth season finale and was in talks with producers for a recurring role for the fifth season. Peck would later film his scenes with Lively for the season premiere. French actress and model Roxane Mesquida was cast as Beatrice, Louis' sister and Blair's nemesis in a recurring role for the fifth season. Actress Elizabeth Hurley was cast as media mogul Diana Payne and starred in a multi-episode arc, with the character being described as "a sexy, smart, self-made media mogul and an all-around force to be reckoned with." Former Lost actor Marc Menard joined the cast in the role of Father Cavalia, a handsome priest from Monaco who will preside over Blair's wedding.

Brian J. Smith, known for his role on Stargate Universe, had been cast as a love interest for Serena while she is in Los Angeles and would appearing on the show as Max, an aspiring chef. Connor Paolo, who went on to become a regular on ABC's Revenge, did not return to the show as Eric van der Woodsen stating, "I'm done. You should never go back in life. Only forward." In an interview with Elle magazine on August 16, 2011, Momsen stated that she had quit the series to focus fully on her music career. Hollywood stuntwoman Zoë Bell was slated to appear on the show and made her debut in the season premiere. New York magazine noted the appearance of American novelist Jay McInerney, who reprised his role as writer Jeremiah Harris. Aaron Tveit, who previously portrayed Nate's cousin Tripp van der Bilt in the third season, returned to the show for a multi-episode arc.

Michelle Trachtenberg reprised her role as Georgina Sparks, who was last seen in the fourth season finale. She made her first appearance during the show's 100th episode. Also returning was William Baldwin as Serena and Eric's father, William van der Woodsen, for the season's 17th episode, which aired in February 2012. It was also reported that Desmond Harrington, who made a cameo appearance in the fall finale, would return as Chuck's uncle, Jack Bass. Also guest starring was One Life to Live''s alum David A. Gregory as a friend of the real Charlie Rhodes (Ella Rae Peck). Cobra Starship's Gabe Saporta made a cameo in season 5 finale.

Plot

Season five opens in Los Angeles, where a vacationing Chuck and Nate decide to visit Serena, who is working on a film set. Back in New York, Blair learns that planning a royal wedding can be stressful, especially with a baby on the way, and Dan discovers the consequences of writing candidly about his closest friends. Also, the surprise return of cousin Charlie will threaten to destroy the van der Woodsen family.

Confused about Chuck's sudden change, Blair is determined to prove his behaviour is an act to win her back.

The series' 100th episode focused on Blair's wedding to prince Louis. "I think it's our biggest episode since the pilot", said executive producer Joshua Safran.

Release
With the move to 8:00pm, The CW charged $50,304 for a 30-second advertising slot before the fifth season began airing.

Ratings
The season premiere was watched by 1.37 million viewers and received a 0.7 rating in the Adults 19–49 demo, down 0.3 compared to last season's premiere.
Episode 23 hit a new series low, hitting for the fourth time a total viewership below the one-million-viewer mark, to 869,000 viewers and a 0.4 in the 18-49 demographic.

References

External links
 List of Gossip Girl season 5 episodes on IMDb

2011 American television seasons
2012 American television seasons